Semantic anti-realism may refer to:

 Semantic anti-realism (epistemology), a position put forward by Michael Dummett
 Semantic anti-realism (philosophy of science), a position criticized by Stathis Psillos